West Kilbride railway station is a railway station that serves the village of West Kilbride, North Ayrshire, Scotland. The station is managed by ScotRail and is on the Ayrshire Coast Line.

History 

The station was opened on 1 May 1878 by the Glasgow and South Western Railway as part of the extension of the former Ardrossan Railway to Largs. The present station building was designed in 1900 by the noted architect James Miller. A camping coach was positioned here by the Scottish Region from 1954 to 1957, two coaches were here in 1964 and three from 1965 to 1967.

Originally a two platform station, the southbound platform was demolished as part of the electrification works in 1985. The former northbound line (to Largs) is electrified and signalled for bi-directional working, being used by passenger trains for both directions, and by northbound freight trains to the Hunterston Terminal. The former southbound track is signalled for southbound working only and is not electrified, being used by southbound trains from Hunterston.
The station building still stands but is no longer used as part of the station itself. Since the ticket office closed the building has been home to shops, cafés, and a restaurant but has now fallen into disuse.

Services
Some extra trains run at peak times. Typical journey times to Glasgow are 48–54 minutes (depending on stopping pattern).

References

Notes

Sources

External links
 YouTube video of West Kilbride railway station

Category B listed buildings in North Ayrshire
Listed railway stations in Scotland
Railway stations in North Ayrshire
Former Glasgow and South Western Railway stations
Railway stations in Great Britain opened in 1878
Railway stations served by ScotRail
SPT railway stations
James Miller railway stations